Aati, also called Ati, meaning "a leper," was an Egyptian goddess and one of the 42 judges of the dead. Aati comes from Heliopolis. The god will question the sins of a soul traveling through the underworld. The soul of the dead was supposed to deny the accusation by responding with the line: "O Aati who comes from Heliopolis, I have not foolishly set my mouth in motion against another man."

References 

Ancient Egyptian religion
Héliopolis District